Henning Ohlson (1884–1941) was a Swedish playwright and screenwriter.

Selected filmography
 Her Little Majesty (1925)
 The Million Dollars (1926)
 Uncle Frans (1926)
 The Queen of Pellagonia (1927)
 Jansson's Temptation (1928)
The Poetry of Ådalen (1928)
 Ocean Breakers (1935)

References

Bibliography
 Chandler, Charlotte. Ingrid: Ingrid Bergman, A Personal Biography. Simon and Schuster, 2007.

External links

1884 births
1941 deaths
Swedish male screenwriters
20th-century Swedish screenwriters
20th-century Swedish male writers